Propellants, Explosives, Pyrotechnics is a monthly peer-reviewed scientific journal covering all aspects of research on explosives. It was established in 1976 by Hiltmar Schubert and was intended as a successor to Explosivstoffe, a journal which had appeared between 1953 and 1975 but which had been published exclusively in German. It has been the official journal of the International Pyrotechnics Society since 1982 and is published by Wiley-VCH. The types of papers published by the journal are full papers, communications, and reviews, and a section containing news, obituaries, book reviews, and conference reports. The editors-in-chief are Peter Elsner and Randall L. Simpson (Lawrence Livermore National Laboratory). According to the Journal Citation Reports, the journal has a 2020 impact factor of 1.887.

References

External links

Chemistry journals
Publications established in 1976
English-language journals
Wiley-VCH academic journals
Monthly journals